William Findlay Maclean (August 10, 1854 – December 7, 1929) was a Canadian politician.

Born in Ancaster, Wentworth County, Ontario, the son of John Maclean and Isabella Findlay, he was educated at the Hamilton Public School and the University of Toronto. A journalist, he established The Toronto World in 1880.

He ran unsuccessfully in North Wentworth for the Legislative Assembly of Ontario in the general elections of 1890, and in York East for the House of Commons of Canada in the general elections of 1891. He was first elected to the House of Commons in an 1892 by-election for the riding of York East after the death of the sitting MP and former Prime Minister, Alexander Mackenzie.

A Conservative, he would be re-elected 8 more times serving for 34 years for York East and York South until being defeated in 1926. Beginning in the 1900 federal election, Maclean stood as an "Independent Conservative" with the exception of 1917 election when he was elected as a Unionist.

He ran for Mayor of Toronto in the 1902 Toronto municipal election on a platform of public ownership but failed to unseat incumbent Mayor Oliver Aiken Howland in part because of his intention to sit both as mayor and as an MP simultaneously.

Archives 
There is a William Findlay Maclean fonds at Library and Archives Canada. Archival reference number is R5663.

References

External links
 
 

1854 births
1929 deaths
Conservative Party of Canada (1867–1942) MPs
Independent Conservative MPs in the Canadian House of Commons
Members of the House of Commons of Canada from Ontario
Politicians from Hamilton, Ontario
University of Toronto alumni